Shorewood Forest is a census-designated place (CDP) in Union Township, Porter County, in the U.S. state of Indiana. The community centers on Lake Louise, an artificial water body. The population of the CDP was 2,708 at the 2010 census.

Geography
U.S. Route 30, the Lincoln Highway, forms the northern boundary of the CDP.

The lake is located on a tributary of Salt Creek, which is part of the Little Calumet River watershed.

Demographics

References

External links
Shorewood Forest Property Owners Association

Census-designated places in Porter County, Indiana
Census-designated places in Indiana